The 38th Robert Awards ceremony, presented by Danish Film Academy, took place on 6 February 2021 virtually to honour the best in Danish film and television of 2020.

Winners and nominees
The nominations were announced on 6 January 2021. Winners are listed first, highlighted in boldface, and indicated with a double dagger.

Film

Films with multiple nominations and awards

Television

Shows with multiple nominations and awards

References

External links
  

2020 film awards
2021 in Denmark
February 2021 events in Denmark
Robert Awards ceremonies